Catalan Workers Bloc was a political party in Catalonia, Spain. Formed in 1978 through the merger of the Party of Labour of Catalonia (PTC) and the Marxist Unification Movement (MUM). BCT participated in the National Liberation Left Bloc (BEAN) in the 1979 general elections.

In 1982 when BEAN was dissolved, BCT dissolved and most of its members joined the Left Nationalists (NE).

References

 BCT www.marxists.org

Defunct communist parties in Catalonia
Political parties established in 1978
1978 establishments in Spain
Political parties disestablished in 1982
1982 disestablishments in Spain